This list covers television programs whose first letter (excluding "the") of the title is E.

E

Numbers

E:60

EA

Eagleheart
Early Doors
Early Edition
The Early Show
Earth 2
Earth Final Conflict
Earth Revealed: Introductory Geology
Earth to Luna
Earthworm Jim
Eastbound & Down
EastEnders
East Midlands Today
Eastwick

EB 

 Ebb and Flo

EC

Eckhart
ECW Hardcore TV
ECW on TNN

ED

Ed
Ed, Edd, and Eddy
The Ed Sullivan Show
Eddsworld (Web series)
The Eddy Arnold Show
Eddy Arnold Time
Eden of the East
Edgar & Ellen
The Edge (US)
The Edge and Christian Show
The Edge of Space
The Edge of Night
Educating Joey Essex (British

EE

Eek! the Cat
Eerie, Indiana

EG
 Egyxos

EI
E Is for Edie
Eight Is Enough
The Eighties

EJ
Ejector Seat
EJNYC

EL

El Chapulín Colorado Animado (Mexico)
El Chavo Animado (Mexico)
El Chavo del Ocho (Mexico)
Electra Woman and Dyna Girl (1976)
Electra Woman and Dyna Girl (2001)
The Electric Company (1971)
The Electric Company (2009)
Elementary
Elena of Avalor
The Elephant Princess (Australia)
Eli Stone
Elizabeth R
Elinor Wonders Why
Ella the Elephant
Ellen
The Ellen DeGeneres Show
The Ellen Show
Ellen's Acres
Ellen's Design Challenge
Ellen's Game of Games
Elliot Moose
Elmo's World
El Perro y El Gato
El Tigre: The Adventures of Manny Rivera
Eliot Kid
Elliott from Earth
Eleventh Hour (UK)
Eleventh Hour (US)
Ellery Queen

EM

Emergency!
Emergency Vets
Emily's Reasons Why Not
Emmerdale
Emogenius
The Emperor's New School
Empire (1962)
Empire (1984)
Empire (2005)
Empire (2012)
Empire (2015)
Empresses in the Palace
Empty Nest

EN
E.N.G.
Encantadia
The End of the F***ing World
Endgame
The Enemy Within
E! News
Engie Benjy (UK) 
Engine Sentai Go-Onger
The English Game
Enlightened
Enlisted
Ensign O'Toole
Entertainment Tonight
Entourage

EO 

 Eon Kid

EP

The Epic Tales of Captain Underpants
Episodes

EQ

The Equalizer (1985)
The Equalizer (2021)
Equal Time

ER

E/R (sitcom)
ER
The Eric Andre Show
Eric & Jessie: Game On
Eric Sykes
E-Ring
Erky Perky
Eromanga Sensei (Japan)

ES

Escape Club
Escrava Isaura (Brazil)
ESPN Sports Saturday
ESPN Sunday Night Football
E Street
Esme & Roy

ET

Eternal Law
E! True Hollywood Story

EU
Euphoria
Eureka (2006)
Eureka (2022)
Eureeka's Castle
European Football Show (UK)

EV

Even Stevens
Evening Shade
The Event
The Everglades
Everwood
Ever After High
Ever Decreasing Circles (BBC)
Every Witch Way
Everybody Hates Chris
Everybody Loves Raymond
Everyday Italian
Everyday Active
Everything's Rosie
Everything Sucks!
Evil Con Carne

EX

Ex on the Beach (UK)
Ex on the Beach (US)
Ex on the Beach Poland
Excused
The Exes
Exit 57
The Exorcist
Exosquad
The Expanse
Expedition Robinson (Sweden)
Expedition Unknown
Exposé: America's Investigative Reports
Extra
Extra Challenge
Extras
Extraordinary People
Extreme Clutter with Peter Walsh
Extreme Dodgeball
Extreme Evidence
Extreme Ghostbusters
Extreme Makeover
Extreme Makeover: Home Edition
Extreme Weight Loss

EY

Eye Candy
Eye Guess
Eyewitness (1994)
Eyewitness (2016)
Eye Witness

EZ

EZ Streets

Previous:  List of television programs: D    Next:  List of television programs: F